Steve Potts (born January 21, 1943 in Columbus, Ohio) is an American jazz saxophonist. Playing mainly alto sax and occasionally soprano, Potts is best known for his 30-year partnership with fellow saxophonist Steve Lacy.

A cousin of tenor saxophonist Buddy Tate, Potts studied architecture in Los Angeles and took lessons from saxophonist Charles Lloyd. Afterwards he went to New York where he was student of Eric Dolphy and performed with Roy Ayers, Richard Davis, Joe Henderson, Reggie Workman, and Chico Hamilton.

In 1970 he moved to Europe to live in Paris. He performed with Dexter Gordon, Johnny Griffin, Slide Hampton, Mal Waldron, Ben Webster, Hal Singer, Christian Escoudé, Boulou Ferré, and Oliver Johnson. Around 1973 he met Steve Lacy and played in his groups for 30 years. Potts also produced film scores.

Discography

As leader/co-leader
Great Day in the Morning with Jessye Norman, 1982
Cross Roads, 1979
People, 1986
Flim-Flam (hat ART, 1986 [1991]) with Steve Lacy
Thank You for Being, 1995
Mukta, 1998
Pearl, 1990
Wet Spot, 2000

As sideman
With Chico Hamilton
The Gamut (Solid State, 1968)
The Head Hunters (Solid State, 1969)
With Steve Lacy
Mal Waldron with the Steve Lacy Quintet (America, 1972)
The Gap (America, 1972)
The Crust (Emanem, 1973)
Scraps (Saravah, 1974)
Flakes (RCA Vista, 1974)
Dreams (Saravah, 1975)
Raps (Adelphi, 1977)
Follies (FMP, 1977)
The Owl (Saravah, 1977)
Points (Chant Du Monde, 1978)
 Stamps (HatHut, 1979)
Troubles (Black Saint, 1979)
The Way (Hathut, 1979 [1980])
Tips (Hathut, 1979)
Songs (hat ART, 1981) with Brion Gysin
Ballets (Hathut, 1981)
Blinks (Hathut, 1983)
Prospectus (hat ART, 1983) also released as Cliches
Futurities (Hathut, 1984)
The Condor (Soul Note, 1985)
The Gleam (Silkheart, 1986)
Morning Joy (Hathut, 1986)
Live in Budapest (West Wind, 1987)
Momentum (Novus, 1987)
The Window (Novus, 1988)
The Door (Novus, 1989)
Anthem (Novus, 1990)
Itinerary (Hathut, 1991)
Live at Sweet Basil (RCA Novus, 1992)
Clangs (hat ART, 1993)
We See (Hathut, 1993)
Vespers (Soul Note, 1993)
Revenue (Soul Note, 1993)

Film scores 
Sujet ou Le secrétaire aux 1001 tiroirs, 1975
Bengali Night, 1988
Louise (take 2), 1998

External links 
 http://www.stevepotts.net/

1943 births
American jazz saxophonists
American male saxophonists
Living people
World Saxophone Quartet members
21st-century American saxophonists
21st-century American male musicians
American male jazz musicians